Steve Inwood (born January 3, 1947)  is an American actor .

Inwood appeared mainly in the early 1980s with roles in such films as Fame - The Path To Glory, Prince of the City and Staying Alive. After that, he focused on appearances in television productions.

In the late 1990s Inwood retired from films and TV.

Filmography

 1973 Hurry Up, or I'll Be 30 as Tony
 1974 The Rehearsal
 1977 Contract on Cherry Street (TV movie) as Fran Marks
 1978 Wonder Woman (TV series, one episode) as Mac
 1980 Cruising
 1980 Fame as François Lafete
 1980 Countdown in Manhattan as Deitz
 1981 Prince of the City as Assistant U.S. Attorney Mario Vincente
 1981 Jacqueline Susann's Valley of the Dolls (TV movie) as Teddi Casablanca
 1982 A Question of Honor (TV movie) as Luke Romano
 1982 The Paw of the Tigress (TV movie, Farrell for the People) as Alan Hellinger
 1983 The Fighter (TV movie) as Toby
 1983 Staying Alive - Jesse
1983: Grizzly II: Revenge as Nick Hollister
 1985 Crime of Innocence (TV movie) as Dennis Spector
 1986 Matlock (TV series, one episode) as Steve Emerson
 1986 Dark Mansions (TV movie) as Jerry Mills
 1986 Night Patrol (Night Heat, TV series, one episode) as Ron DiCosta
 1987 The Hitchhiker (TV series, one episode) as Simon Hopper
 1987-1995 Murder, She Wrote (TV series, three episodes) - Rudy Grimes / Sergeant Petrakas / Cash Logan
 1988 Spenser: For Hire (TV series, one episode) as Tom McAllister
 1988 Something Is Out There (TV series, one episode)
 1989 General Hospital (TV series, one episode) as Moreno #2
 1990 Booker (TV series, one episode) as Nick Booker
 1991 The Human Shield as Ali Dallal
 1991-1992 The Trials of Rosie O'Neill (TV series, two episodes)
 1994 Almost Dead as Police Chief
 1995 One West Waikiki (TV series, one episode) as Allie Wade
 1995 Murder One (TV series, one episode) as Walter London
 1997 Dellaventura (TV series, one episode) as Lieutenant Kovac (final appearance)

References

External links

1947 births
Living people
American male actors